Operation Luger was a joint military operation between the Canadian Forces and Afghan National Army. In July 2007, the Afghan-led operation was intended to enhance security within the Panjwayii district.

External links 
 Canadian Expeditionary Force Command Website

Military operations of the War in Afghanistan (2001–2021)
Military operations of the War in Afghanistan (2001–2021) involving Canada